Roger Eugene Dickinson (born September 22, 1950) is an American  attorney and former Democratic member of the California State Assembly, serving the 7th district. Before that he was a Sacramento County supervisor. Dickinson was first elected to the board in a special election in January 1994.

Education and early career

Dickinson received his undergraduate degree from the University of California at Berkeley where he lettered in varsity basketball and afterward earned a Juris Doctor degree at UCLA in 1976. He spent seven and a half years with the California Department of Consumer Affairs where he oversaw a statewide project to improve small claims court. In private practice, he helped to form the firm of Kemnitzer, Dickinson, Anderson & Barron emphasizing automobile warranty law and sales misrepresentation cases. He has litigated cases up to the California Supreme Court.

Prior to his election to the Board of Supervisors, Dickinson participated in numerous community organizations. He spent eight years as a member of the Regional Transit Board of Directors and was chairman of the board twice. He also served on the Sacramento Housing and Redevelopment Commission, the Sacramento County Air Pollution Control Advisory Board, and the North Sacramento Community Plan Citizens Advisory Committee. In addition, Dickinson served on the board and as President of the American Lung Association of Sacramento, and chaired the Sacramento Transportation Coalition. He is the former President of the Friends of Light Rail and board member of the Sacramento Tree Foundation.

Political career

Dickinson served on the Sacramento County Board of Supervisors beginning in a special election in January 1994, and was subsequently re-elected to four four-year terms, serving through 2010. He was elected in November 2010 and represents the 7th Assembly District which includes the city of Sacramento.

Sacramento County Board of Supervisors

As a member of the Sacramento County Board of Supervisors, Dickinson played key roles on issues such as health care, welfare reform, economic development, clean air, improved transportation, and smart growth.  He was instrumental in the building of Raley Field, home of the Sacramento River Cats; the transition of McClellan Air Force Base into a thriving economic center; the construction of a new primary health care center for Sacramento County; the conversion of the county vehicle fleet to clean fuels; the creation of Birth and Beyond, a home visitation program for at-risk families; the creation of the Dry Creek Parkway; and the turnaround of the Grant Joint Union School District; among other things.

California State Assembly

Dickinson was elected to the State Assembly in 2010.   He decided to run for the 6th Senate District seat being vacated by Senate President pro Tempore Darrell Steinberg, who was terming out, in the 2014 Elections.  Dickinson lost the race to Democrat Assemblyman Richard Pan.

Legislative priorities

Public Safety

AB 2460 (Firearms) 2012 - The California Department of Justice maintains a roster of firearms which, as a result of passing a drop test and having features such as a load indicator, are certified to be safe for sale to the public. The sale of firearms that are not certified as safe by the California Department of Justice is prohibited to the general public, and permitted only to specific groups including law enforcement. AB 2460 would have closed a loophole that allowed law enforcement officials, who are legally allowed to own non-rostered firearms, to transfer a non-rostered firearm to a member of the generally public, who is not legally allowed to own such a weapon. This bill was vetoed by the Governor.

AB 169(Firearms)2013  - This bill was substantially similar to AB 2460 from the previous year, with certain changes and exemptions made. The bill would provide for several exemptions from the provisions of the law, allowing for up to two transfers of non-rostered firearms to a person per person per year, as well as an exemption for certain single-shot firearms. This bill was vetoed by the Governor.

AB 760 (Firearms) 2013 - This bill proposed a five cent($0.05) tax on each bullet sold in the State of California. Revenues collected from this tax would fund the Early Mental Health Initiative program, which provides school-based mental services for children. The bill was held in committee at the author's request.

Environment

AB 134 (Recycle Water Authority) – The bill authorized the Sacramento County Regional Sanitation District to sell recycled water on the open market.  The revenue generated would be applied towards the costs of upgrading the facility as mandated by the State.  This legislation is sponsored by the Sacramento County Regional Sanitation District.

Transportation

AB 716 (Sacramento Regional Transit District (RT): Passenger Safety Program) – The bill repeals the sunset date for the authorization provided to the Sacramento Regional Transit District (RT) and the Fresno Area Express (FAX) to implement additional transit security measures to curb passenger misconduct and reduce nuisance behavior in specified transit facilities.  This bill  also provides the same authority to the Bay Area Rapid Transit District (BART) on a 3-year pilot- program basis.

Education

AB 965 (California Community Colleges: full-time faculty hiring) – This bill would allows a percentage of enrollment growth funding to be used for full-time faculty hiring.

AB 1262 (Teachers: right to re-appointment) – The bill holds charter schools accountable to the same standards as public schools by including charter schools within identification of Persistently Low Performing Schools.  The bill would also require a report due on or before July 1, 2016, by the non-partisan Legislative Analyst Office (LAO) on the effectiveness of charter schools compared to public schools.  This legislation is sponsored by the California Teachers Association (CTA).

Youth

AB 526 (Gang and Youth Violence Reduction and Prevention Programs) – The bill requires that gang and youth violence reduction and prevention programs implement evidence-based practices.

AB 823 (Children's Cabinet of California) – The bill establishes the Children’s Cabinet of California, which would be co-chaired by the Health and Human Services Agency Secretary and the Superintendent of Public Instruction and would include the heads of agencies and departments that provide services for children.  The Cabinet would serve as an advisory board to the Governor and the Legislature on ways to improve cross-agency coordination and the efficient delivery of services to children and their families.

Personal
Dickinson obtained his undergraduate degree from the UC Berkeley where he lettered in varsity basketball. He received his Juris Doctor degree from UCLA Law School in 1976. He lives in the Woodlake neighborhood of Sacramento.

References

External links
 Campaign website
 Join California Roger Dickinson
 

1950 births
American law firm executives
Lawyers from Sacramento, California
Living people
Democratic Party members of the California State Assembly
Politicians from New Haven, Connecticut
Politicians from Sacramento, California
Sacramento County Supervisors
University of California, Berkeley alumni
UCLA School of Law alumni
21st-century American politicians
Lawyers from New Haven, Connecticut